James Milburn Hartley (29 October 1876 – 12 November 1913) was a Scottish professional footballer who played as an inside forward, most notably in the Football League for Lincoln City.

Career statistics

References

1876 births
Sportspeople from Dumbarton
Footballers from West Dunbartonshire
Scottish footballers
Association football forwards
Dumbarton F.C. players
Sunderland A.F.C. players
Burnley F.C. players
Lincoln City F.C. players
Tottenham Hotspur F.C. players
Rangers F.C. players
Brentford F.C. players
Gillingham F.C. players
English Football League players
Scottish Football League players
1913 deaths